The National Prize for the Work of a Translator is a translation national award conferred by the Ministry of Culture and Sport.

Winners 
 2018 - Carmen Gauger
 2017 - Malika Embarek
 2016 - Ramón Buenaventura
 2015 - Jordi Fibla
 2014 - Mariano Antolín Rato
 2013 - Josu Zabaleta
 2012 - Francisco J. Uriz
 2011 - Selma Ancira
 2010 - Adan Kovacsis
 2009 - Roser Berdagué Costa
 2008 - María Teresa Gallego Urrutia
 2007 - José Luis Reina Palazón
 2006 - Agustín García Calvo
 2005 - Francisco Rodríguez Adrados
 2004 - Juan José del Solar
 2003 - Eustaquio Barjau
 2002 - Carlos García Gual
 2001 - Francisco Torres Oliver
 2000 - José Luis López Muñoz
 1999 - Luis Gil Fernández
 1998 - Valentín García Yebra
 1997 - Clara Janés
 1996 - Salustiano Masó
 1995 - Andrés Sánchez Pascual
 1994 - Feliu Formosa
 1993 - Ángel Crespo
 1992 - Esther Benítez Eiroa
 1991 - Miguel Sáenz
 1990 - José María Valverde
 1989 - Juan Ramón Masoliver

See also 
 National Prize for Literature (Spain)

References 

Spanish literary awards
Translation awards